Virtual home design software is a type of computer-aided design software intended to help architects, designers, and homeowners preview their design implementations on-the-fly. These products differ from traditional homeowner design software and other online design tools in that they use HTML5 to ensure that changes to the design occur rapidly. This category of software as a service puts an emphasis on usability, speed, and customization.

Background 

Homeowners, contractors, and architects use virtual home exterior design software to help visualize changes to designs. Since virtual home design suites that use HTML5 are able to rapidly propagate changes to the home design, users can A/B test designs much more efficiently than with previous iterations of online design software.

Virtual home design software has found widespread usage among homeowners who have suffered property damage, as server-side, HTML5-based design software is ideal for homeowners who wish to see what certain products will look like on damaged areas of their houses.

Examples 

Several manufacturers use virtual home design software to display their products online. These companies that utilize virtual home design software include GAF Materials Corporation, James Hardie, Exterior Portfolio, and CertainTeed. Some companies, such as Design My Exterior, have built virtual home design software that is not limited to products or brands in order to allow for greater flexibility by the end-user. Design My Exterior also uses ImageMapster in order to generate a greater range of options with less processing time.

Live Home 3D is a virtual home design software for Microsoft Windows and macOS.

Future applications
Several companies are experimenting with virtual reality for architecture. They design virtual homes and allow customers to walk around with the help of a VR headset (such as the Occulus Rift). This way, customers get a realistic, true-to-scale idea of the end result.

References 

Computer-aided design software
Architectural design
Interior design